Amin Tareq Affane; born 21 January 1994) is a Swedish former professional footballer who played as a midfielder.

Club career

Lärje-Angereds IF
Affane, who was playing for the Division 3 team Lärje-Angereds IF, agreed to join Chelsea in January 2010, leaving Lärje-Angereds IF to head to London ahead of interest from some of Europe's biggest teams including AC Milan, Juventus, Real Madrid, Manchester United, and Manchester City.

Chelsea
He missed much of his first year in England due to injury, but pressed on towards the end of the season and put a run of games together in the Under-18s. He made his reserve debut in April 2011.

Loan to Roda JC 
On 30 August 2012, Affane signed a season-long loan deal with the Dutch side Roda JC.

On 1 September 2012, Affane made his debut for the club against Willem II where he came on as a substitute in the second half and provided the assist for Krisztián Németh's goal and also won the Man of the match. Roda JC went on to win the match 3–0 and this was their first league win in the 2012–13 season. He started his first game for Roda in their next fixture on 16 September 2012 away to AZ Alkmaar, where the game ended in a 4–0 loss. On 25 September 2012, Affane made his KNVB Cup debut for Roda, where they lost 1–0 at home to PEC Zwolle in the extra time. On 30 September 2012, he scored his first goal for Roda in an Eredivisie match where they lost 3–2 to Groningen. He came in as a substitute in the 71st minute and awarded the team with a hard shot from 22 meters and scored the equalizer from a pass by Abel Tamata, 2–2 in the 78th minute. On 20 October 2012, Amin again came in to play as a substitute in the second half of the match where they were drawn 1–1 to FC Twente and assisted the only goal by them, which was scored by Guus Hupperts, while Affane's low cross was missed by Twente goalkeeper Nikolay Mihaylov. On 11 November 2012, Affane set up their two goals which were scored by Senharib Malki and Bart Biemans, both from corners in a 5–2 away loss against Feyenoord at De Kuip. Amin Affane returned to Chelsea after seeing the loan spell at Eredivisie side Roda JC cut short. He initially saw plenty of first-team football at Roda, but fell out of favour in February and has subsequently been deemed surplus to requirements.

Energie Cottbus 
On 27 May 2013 it was announced that Affane had signed a three-year contract with Energie Cottbus. After Cottbus were relegated from the 2. Bundesliga at the end of the 2013–14 season, he signed for VfL Wolfsburg II.

AIK 
On 5 January 2016, Affane signed a three-year contract with Swedish club AIK.

IFK Göteborg 
Affane finished up his career at IFK Göteborg before deciding to retire from professional football at the age of 26.

International career
Affane represented Sweden at the U17, U19, and U21 levels. He was also eligible to play for Morocco.

Career statistics

Club

1Includes other competitive competitions, including the Johan Cruijff Shield.

Honours
Chelsea Youth
FA Youth Cup: 2011–12

References

1994 births
Living people
Swedish people of Moroccan descent
Swedish footballers
Swedish expatriate footballers
Association football midfielders
Chelsea F.C. players
Roda JC Kerkrade players
FC Energie Cottbus players
VfL Wolfsburg II players
Arminia Bielefeld players
AIK Fotboll players
IFK Göteborg players
Örgryte IS players
Expatriate footballers in England
Expatriate footballers in the Netherlands
Expatriate footballers in Germany
Swedish expatriate sportspeople in England
Swedish expatriate sportspeople in the Netherlands
Swedish expatriate sportspeople in Germany
Eredivisie players
2. Bundesliga players
Regionalliga players
Allsvenskan players
Sweden under-21 international footballers
Sweden youth international footballers
Footballers from Gothenburg